Organovanadium chemistry is the chemistry of organometallic compounds containing a carbon (C) to vanadium (V) chemical bond. Organovanadium compounds find only minor use as reagents in organic synthesis but are significant for polymer chemistry as catalysts.
 
Oxidation states for vanadium are +2, +3, +4 and +5. Low valency vanadium is usually stabilized with carbonyl ligands. Oxo derivatives are relatively common, unlike the organic complexes of neighboring elements.

Compound classes

Carbonyls
Vanadium carbonyl can be prepared by reductive carbonylation of vanadium salts:
4 Na + VCl3 + 6 CO → Na[V(CO)6] + 3 NaCl
The salt can be oxidized to the 17e binary carbonyl V(CO)6.

Cyclopentadienyl derivatives

Vanadocene dichloride, the first organovanadium complexes to be reported, is prepared from sodium cyclopentadienyl and vanadium tetrachloride:
2 NaC5H5 + VCl4 → VCp2Cl2 + 2NaCl
Reduction of this compound gives the parent vanadocene (Cp2V):
VCp2Cl2 + LiAlH4 → VCp2

Vanadocene is the lightest transition metal metallocene that is isolable at room temperature. Vanadocene reacts with high pressures of carbon monoxide to give CpV(CO)4. Photolysis of the tetracarbonyl gives Cp2V2(CO)5. Several analogous indenyl complexes are known.  

Monocyclopentadienyl vanadium chlorides include CpVCl3 and the diamagnetic CpVOCl2.

Arene complexes
Vanadium forms a variety of arene complexes, e.g. with benzene:
VCl4  +  Al  +  2C6H6   →   [V(η6-C6H6)2]AlCl4 
[V(η6-C6H6)2]AlCl4  +  H2O  →  V(η6-C6H6)2  +  ...

Alkyl and aryl derivatives
A handful of alkyl and aryl complexes exist. The reactive species V(mesityl)3 forms from VCl3:
VCl3(THF)3 + 3 LiC6H2-2,4,6-Me3 → V(C6H2-2,4,6-Me3)3(THF) + 3 LiCl
This species binds CO and, under appropriate conditions, N2.  V(mesityl)3 adds a fourth mesityl group and the resulting "ate complex" can be oxidized to the vanadium(IV) derivative:
 V(mes)3(THF)  + LiMes   → Li[V(mes)4]
 Li[V(mes)4]   + air  → V(mes)4(THF)
The tetrakis(norbornyl) complex is also known.

Vanadium oxytrichloride is a starting material for organovanadium(IV) and organovanadium(V) compounds:
 VOCl3  + Li(mes)   → Li[VO(mes)3]
 Li[VO(mes)3] + chloranil → VO(mes)3
 VOCl3  + ZnPh2   → VOPhCl2  +  "ZnPh(Cl)"

Catalysts and reagents
Well-defined vanadium compounds do not appear as catalysts in any commercial process.  However organovanadium species are clearly implicated as catalysts for the production of butadiene-based rubbers.  These catalysts are generated in situ by treating soluble coordination complexes such as vanadium(III) acetylacetonate with organoaluminium activators.

References